The National Institute on Media and the Family (NIMF), founded by psychologist David Walsh in 1996 and closed in 2009 was a nonprofit organization based in Minneapolis, Minnesota. It was a nonsectarian advocacy group which sought to monitor mass media for content that it deemed is harmful to children and families. The group characterized itself as "an international resource center for cutting-edge research and information" and denied playing any role in media censorship.

MediaWise movement 
The MediaWise movement is the publicity and community outreach arm of the NIMF. Through it the organization sponsors speaking engagements given by its staff throughout the country, although most events take place at educational and religious institutions in the state of Minnesota. David Walsh is notable as the spokesperson for the NIMF, having given numerous interviews to national news programs and newspapers in this capacity.

Video Game Report Cards 
The primary publication of the MediaWise movement is an annual report on the marketing, distribution, and impact of video games to minors. This "Video Game Report Card" comprises results to national surveys, summaries of recently completed research projects, and a grade-based assessment of the Entertainment Software Association's efforts to regulate the sales of video games to minors.

The 2005 MediaWise Video Game Report Card criticized the Entertainment Software Rating Board's system of rating video games for age-appropriate conduct in its annual series of report cards, noting the scarcity of "Adults-Only" rated games and citing the perceived inadequacy in retailer enforcement. Several days after the report was released, the United States National Parent Teacher Association issued a press release condemning it, stating that "[the report card] contained erroneous statements about National PTA's position on the Entertainment Software Rating Board's (ESRB) rating system. In fact, National PTA does not endorse NIMF's report. Further, it does not agree with the report's characterization of ESRB and its rating system."

Controversies 

In 2005 the NIMF made the controversial claim that the video game industry was promoting cannibalism after analyzing stills and video clips from a zombie-themed game titled Stubbs the Zombie in Rebel Without a Pulse. Dr. Walsh was asked about this in a podcast interview with Dennis McCauley, owner of gamepolitics.com. During the interview Dr. Walsh did not acknowledge the NIMF's apparent error, instead claiming that video gamers tricked him into thinking there was cannibalism in the game.

In late 2003 Walsh proposed the coining of a neologism to fill what he sees is a gap in English vocabulary: killographic, to be defined as the "graphic depiction of brutal violence."  This is intended as an analogy to "pornographic", which he defines as the "graphic depiction of sexual acts".  This term has been the subject of considerable public debate.  Doug Lowenstein, head of the Entertainment Software Association, described it as a "clever phrase", but noted that the average age of video gamers is 28, and that "as adults they should be allowed to pick their entertainment."

On December 6, 2005, the ESRB assigned a failing grade of "F" to NIMF for its seriously flawed Video Game Report Card released the previous week.  The ESRB cited inaccuracies, incomplete and misleading statements, omission of material facts, and flawed research as key factors in assigning the failing grade. In addition to the overall failing grade, NIMF was given a demerit for elevating its political and media agenda over their stated concerns for consumer welfare, particularly those of children and teenagers.

References

External links
http://www.mediafamily.org/

1996 establishments in the United States
Video game censorship
Non-profit organizations based in Minnesota
Entertainment rating organizations
Organizations established in 1996
Organizations disestablished in 2009
2009 disestablishments in the United States